Petrus Albertus van der Parra (29 September 1714 – 28 December 1775) was Governor-General of the Dutch East Indies from 1761 to 1775.

Biography
Petrus Albertus van der Parra was born in Colombo, the son of a Secretary to the government of Ceylon. His great-grandfather had come to India and the family had lived there ever since. In 1728, he began his career at fourteen years old. As everyone had to start as a soldier, he began as a "soldaat van de penne", then became an "assistent" in 1731, and "boekhouder" (bookkeeper) in 1732. He had to move house in 1736 to take up a new job as "onderkoopman" (underbuyer/undermerchant), and at the same time "collectionist" (collector) and "boekhouder" to the General Secretary at Batavia/Jakarta. He became "koopman" (buyer/merchant) and "geheimschrijver" (secrets secretary) in 1739. He became Second Secretary to the High Government (Hoge Regering), becoming First Secretary in 1747. He became Counsellor-extraordinary of the Indies later that year (November) and in 1751 became a regular Counsellor. In 1752 he became President of the College van Heemraden (in charge of estate boundaries, roads, etc.). He was later a member of the "Schepenbank" (the local government and court in Batavia), a Regent (a board member) of the hospital and in 1755 he became First Counsellor and Director-General (Eerste Raad en Directeur-Generaal)

On 15 May 1761, following the death of Jacob Mossel he became Governor-General of the Dutch East Indies. Confirmation of his appointment by the Heren XVII (the Seventeen Lords, who controlled the Dutch East India Company) came in 1762. He held a lavish inauguration on his birthday on 29 September.

Subsequently, his birthday was a national holiday in the Indies. During his time as Governor-General, he overthrew the Prince of Kandy, in Ceylon, though with difficulty, and he conquered the sultanate of Siak in Sumatra. Contracts were entered into with various regional leaders in Bima, Soembawa, Dompo, Tambora, Sangar and Papekat.

Van der Parra favoured his friends and gave out well-paid posts if he could get anything in return for them. It was said he was a typical colonial ruler, idle, grumpy but generous to those who fawned upon him and recognised his greatness. It was a golden time for the preachers in Batavia, who got gifts, translations of the New Testament and scholarships from Van der Parra. They worshipped and eulogised him. Although the Heren XVII knew about his behaviour, as five Counsellors had written to them about his pretensions to kingly behaviour, they did nothing about it.

In 1770, Captain James Cook had to ask for his help to proceed on his journeys on HMS Endeavour (See s:Captain Cook's Journal, First Voyage/Chapter 9). At the end of the 19th century, a steamship, trading to the Indies, was named after him.

After over fourteen years in power, he died on 28 September 1775 in Weltevreden, the imposing palace built for him outside Batavia. He apparently left a great deal of his fortune to the widows of Colombo and a smaller part to the poor of Batavia. He was followed as governor by Jeremias van Riemsdijk

He was married to Adriana Johanna Bake.

References

Sources
 Comprehensive Dutch website on the history of the Dutch Eat Indies 
 Biographical Dictionary (in Dutch) 
 L. P. van Putten, Ambitie en Onvermogen, Gouverneurs-generaal van Nederlands-Indië, Rotterdam, 2002
 Jan N. Bremmer, Lourens van den Bosch Between Poverty and the Pyre: Moments in the History of Widowhood Routledge, 1995 , 

1714 births
1775 deaths
Dutch nobility
Governors-General of the Dutch East Indies
People from Colombo
Sri Lankan people of Dutch descent